André Lomami (born 6 August 1987) is a Rwandan international football forward who plays with Police FC Kibungo.

Career
He had previously represented Rwandan clubs Police FC Kibungo, APR FC and ATRACO FC, and during the first half of the 2010-11 season he played with FK Škendija in the Macedonian First League.

Between 2005 and 2008 he won 4 consecutive Rwandan championships and was the league top scorer in 2006.

National team
He played one match in 2006 for the Rwanda national football team.

Honours
Club:
 APR Kigali
Rwandan Premier League: 2005, 2006, 2007
Rwandan Cup: 2006, 2007
CECAFA Clubs Cup: 2007

 ATRACO
Rwandan Premier League: 2008
Rwandan Cup: 2009
CECAFA Club Cup: 2009

 Shkëndija 79
Macedonian First League: 2010-11

Personal:
Rwandan Premier League top scorer: 2006 (13 goals)

References

External sources
 

1987 births
Living people
Rwandan footballers
Rwandan expatriate footballers
Rwanda international footballers
APR F.C. players
KF Shkëndija players
Expatriate footballers in North Macedonia
Association football forwards
People from Kigali
ATRACO F.C. players